The 18th Robert Awards ceremony was held on 4 February 2001 in Copenhagen, Denmark. Organized by the Danish Film Academy, the awards honoured the best in Danish and foreign film of 2000.

Honorees

Best Danish Film 
 Bænken – Per Fly

Best Director 
 Per Fly – Bænken

Best Screenplay 
 Lone Scherfig – Italiensk for begyndere

Best Actor in a Leading Role 
 Jesper Christensen – Bænken

Best Actress in a Leading Role 
 Björk – Dancer in the Dark

Best Actor in a Supporting Role 
 Peter Gantzler – Italiensk for begyndere

Best Actress in a Supporting Role 
 Ann Eleonora Jørgensen – Italiensk for begyndere

Best Cinematography 
 Eric Kress – Flickering Lights

Production Design 
 Karl Juliusson – Dancer in the Dark

Best Costume Design 
 Louize Nissen – Bænken

Best Makeup 
 Charlotte Laustsen – Bænken

Best Special Effects 
 Thomas Borch Nielsen –

Best Sound Design 
 Per Streit – Dancer in the Dark

Best Editing 
 Molly Marlene Steensgaard &  – Dancer in the Dark

Best Score 
 Björk & Mark Bell – Dancer in the Dark

Best Documentary Short 
 Den højeste straf – Tómas Gislason

Best Short Featurette 
 2. juledag – Carsten Myllerup

Best Non-American Film 
 Crouching Tiger, Hidden Dragon – Ang Lee

Best American Film 
 American Beauty – Sam Mendes

Audience Award 
 Flickering Lights

Special Jury Prize (Short) 
  –

See also 

 2001 Bodil Awards

References

External links 
  

2000 film awards
2001 in Denmark
Robert Awards ceremonies
2001 in Copenhagen